Eight Girls in a Boat is a 1932 German musical film directed by Erich Waschneck and starring Karin Hardt, Theodor Loos, and Helmuth Kionka. It was shot at the Tempelhof Studios in Berlin. The film's sets were designed by art director Alfred Junge.

The film has been remade twice, as the 1934 American film Eight Girls in a Boat and as the 1958 Dutch film Jenny. Neither remake was a musical.

Plot 
18-year-old schoolgirl Christa realizes that she is pregnant. Urged to have an abortion by the child's father and rejected by her father, she is in despair. She gets hold and support from her friends in the "Seeschwalben" rowing club. With their help, it is possible to persuade father and friend to rethink.

Cast

References

Bibliography

External links 
 

1932 films
Films of the Weimar Republic
German musical drama films
1930s musical drama films
1930s German-language films
Films directed by Erich Waschneck
Rowing films
Films about women's sports
German black-and-white films
Terra Film films
1932 drama films
1930s German films
Films shot at Tempelhof Studios